Naval Amphibious Base Coronado (NAB Coronado) is a US naval installation located across the bay from San Diego, California. The base, situated on the Silver Strand, between San Diego Bay and the Pacific Ocean, is a major Navy shore command, supporting over 30 tenant commands, and is the West Coast focal point for special and expeditionary warfare training and operations. The onbase population is 5,000 military personnel and 7,000 students and reservists. The base is one of the eight components of Naval Base Coronado (NBC).

History

Formally commissioned in January 1944, Naval Amphibious Base (NAB), Coronado provides a shore base for the operations, training, and support of naval amphibious units on the West Coast. It is one of only two Navy amphibious training bases in the United States. NAB is approximately 1,000 acres (4 km2) in size and is composed of the Main Base, training beaches, California least tern preserve, recreational marina, enlisted family housing, and state park. State Highway 75 separates NAB into surfside (ocean) and bayside sections. The majority of the bayside is composed of fill materials dredged from San Diego Bay in the early 1940s. Amphibious training is conducted on both surfside and bayside beaches. A least tern nesting preserve is located on North and South Delta Beach between the NAB Marina and Main Base. NAB is located within the city of Coronado, California, a community of approximately 30,000. Another naval facility, Naval Air Station (NAS) North Island, is located northwest of the city of Coronado. South of NAB is the Silver Strand.

In June 1943, the Secretary of the Navy authorized the establishment of the Amphibious Training Base in the San Diego area to meet wartimes demands for trained landing craft crews. These crews were deployed to the South Pacific area of operations, where their successful and historical efforts were contributory to the conclusion of World War II. Training for infantry coordination with naval artillery and attack aircraft was provided at the Naval Gunfire Liaison School and Support Air Control School. The streets of the base bear the names of those famous battles which led to the Empire of Japan's defeat: Guadalcanal, Tarawa, Tulagi, and Bougainville, to name a few.

The base has also provided training for Underwater Demolition Teams, United States Navy SEALs, brown-water Navy personnel, and Naval Reserve Officers Training Corps midshipmen.  In 1946, the base was renamed Naval Amphibious Base (NAB) Coronado and its primary mission was changed to that of providing major administrative and logistical support to the amphibious units which are located on the base. The base also conducts research and tests of newly developed amphibious equipment.

Current operations

NAB Coronado is the home to over 30 tenant commands with a population of approximately 5,000 personnel, including major commands such as Commander, Naval Surface Forces Pacific (COMNAVSURFPAC), Commander Naval Special Warfare (SPECWAR) Command and the Commander Expeditionary Warfare Training Group (EWTG) Pacific.

Major commands
Amphibious Construction Battalion One
Assault Craft Unit One
Beachmaster Unit One
Expeditionary Warfare Training Group Pacific
Explosive Ordnance Disposal Group One
Explosive Ordnance Disposal Mobile Unit One
Explosive Ordnance Disposal Mobile Unit Three
Explosive Ordnance Disposal Operational Support Unit Seven (decommissioned)
Naval Special Warfare Command
Naval Special Warfare Center
Commander, Naval Special Warfare Group One
SEAL Team One
SEAL Team Three
SEAL Team Five
SEAL Team Seven
Commander, Naval Special Warfare Group 11 (Navy Reserve)
 SEAL Team 17 (Navy Reserve)
 SEAL Team 18 (Navy Reserve) 
Naval Special Warfare Group Three
Special Boat Team 12
Commander, Tactical Air Control Group One
Tactical Air Control Squadron Eleven
Tactical Air Control Squadron 1194 (Navy Reserve)
Tactical Air Control Squadron Twelve
Tactical Air Control Squadron 1294 (Navy Reserve)
Naval Special Warfare Leadership Education and Development (NLEAD)

In the media

This went unnoticed by the public from its construction in the 1960s until 2007 when it was spotted in aerial views on Google Earth. Although landscaping and architectural modifications were to be made to obscure the shape, June 2017 imagery, the latest used by Google Earth, shows no substantive change.

Education
The housing on-post is in the Coronado Unified School District, and the zones for Village Elementary School, Coronado Middle School, and Coronado High School.

See also
California during World War II

References

External links

Commander Navy Installations Command - Naval Base Coronado, Official Site
Naval Amphibious Base (NAB) Coronado, GlobalSecurity.org
Vietnam Unit Monument Memorial Wall, Coronado, www.vummf.org
Link to Google Maps location
 A photograph of former staff is visible here.

Amphibious Base Coronado
Military facilities in San Diego County, California
Military in San Diego
Coronado, California
San Diego Bay
Military installations established in 1944
1944 establishments in California